Swallow is a 2019 psychological thriller film written and directed by Carlo Mirabella-Davis and starring Haley Bennett, Austin Stowell, Elizabeth Marvel, David Rasche, and Denis O'Hare. Its plot follows a young woman who, emotionally stifled in her marriage and domestic life, develops an impulse to consume inedible objects.

The film had its world premiere at the Tribeca Film Festival on April 28, 2019. It was released in France on January 15, 2020, by UFO Distribution, and in the United States on March 6, 2020, by IFC Films.

Plot
Hunter Conrad, a young woman from a lower-working-class family, has recently married Richie Conrad, a man from a wealthy family who is set to take over as CEO of his father's Manhattan corporation. This affords Hunter the ability to stay at home in the couple's lavish upstate New York home. Despite this, Hunter finds herself emotionally stifled and isolated in both her marriage and domestic life, while Richie is distant and inconsiderate toward her. For example, at a dinner with Richie's parents to congratulate the young couple on their pregnancy, Hunter is enticed to tell a story, only to be interrupted by her father-in-law zoning out and asking Richie about business. One day while home alone, Hunter develops the impulse to eat a marble. She finds it exhilarating and begins to consume other inedible objects around the house, including thumbtacks, metal figurines, and batteries.

Hunter becomes pregnant and the sonogram technician notices an anomaly in her abdomen during the routine ultrasound. She is rushed in for emergency surgery to remove a variety of objects trapped in her intestine. Hunter is diagnosed with pica, a psychological disorder that compels individuals to eat inedible objects. Richie's parents, Katherine and Michael, arrange for her to see a psychiatrist in the city. During her therapy sessions, Hunter says she swallows the objects because she likes the feel of their textures in her mouth.

Richie hires Luay, a family friend and immigrant from Syria, to monitor Hunter while he is at work. Hunter, feeling smothered, is initially hostile toward Luay, who dismisses her mental illness as resulting from her privileged life. In therapy, she eventually reveals she was not raised by her biological father and has never met him, though she knows his name and keeps a picture of him. She was conceived as a result of her mother's rape at the hands of a strange man she had met in a bar. The rapist served time in prison for the crime.

One afternoon, Hunter overhears Richie speaking with her psychiatrist on the phone, and realizes Richie has bribed the doctor to tell him what was discussed in Hunter's therapy sessions. This sends Hunter into a panic, and she swallows a miniature screwdriver. Luay finds her choking violently, and calls 9-1-1. After undergoing surgery to remove the screwdriver, Michael and Katherine arrange to have Hunter committed to a psychiatric hospital for the next seven months until she delivers the baby, threatening that Richie will divorce her. Luay, who has warmed to Hunter, allows her to flee into the woods, and stages it to appear as though she had escaped.

Hunter hitchhikes to a motel and calls Richie, who begs her to return. She explains she had rushed into their marriage and pregnancy to make him happy. When she refuses to come back, he chastises and insults her. Hunter smashes her cell phone and spends the rest of the night watching television and eating soil from outside. The next day, she hitchhikes to the home of her biological father, William Erwin. At William's house, he is celebrating his birthday with family and friends. He and his wife Lucy assume Hunter is the parent of one of their daughter's friends, but she privately reveals her true identity to William. During an emotional conversation, William professes his shame for raping Hunter's mother. Hunter asks him if he is ashamed of her and whether she is like him, which he denies.

Having obtained closure, Hunter visits a clinic and is prescribed medication to induce an abortion. She takes the pills while eating lunch in a food court and experiences the abortion in a public restroom.

Cast
 Haley Bennett as Hunter Conrad
 Austin Stowell as Richie Conrad
 Elizabeth Marvel as Katherine Conrad
 David Rasche as Michael Conrad
 Denis O'Hare as William Erwin
 Lauren Vélez as Lucy
 Zabryna Guevara as Alice
 Laith Nakli as Luay
 Babak Tafti as Aaron
 Nicole Kang as Bev

Production
In September 2016, it was announced that Carlo Mirabella-Davis would direct the film based on a screenplay that he wrote. Mynette Louie, Mollye Asher were slated to produce the film along with Syncopated Films and Standalone Productions. In May 2018, Haley Bennett, Austin Stowell, Elizabeth Marvel, David Rasche and Denis O'Hare joined the cast of the film. Carole Baraton, Frédéric Fiore were also announced as producers under their Charades and Logical Pictures banners, respectively. Joe Wright, Bennett, Constantin Briest, Johann Comte, Pierre Mazars, Eric Tavitian and Sam Bisbee were named executive producers.

Filming
Principal photography began in May 2018. The film was shot in a glass home in Highland, New York, along the Hudson River, and at a nearby farm. Mirabella-Davis attributes the selection of the home to its Hitchcock-like appearance. He also has compared the home's nearby river to a "mood ring", representing freedom, power and danger, a stark contrast to the powerless life that protagonist Hunter finds herself living.

In a 2020 interview, production designer Erin Magill noted that inspiration for the film's overall aesthetic and strong visual look was taken from films such as Safe and Rosemary's Baby. She was also inspired by famous photographers such as Tina Barney, Philip Lorca-diCorcia and Gregory Crewdson.

Release
Swallow had its world premiere at the Tribeca Film Festival on April 28, 2019. Shortly thereafter, IFC Films acquired American distribution rights. It was released in France on January 15, 2020, by UFO Distribution and in the United States on March 6, 2020. It tied for the highest-grossing film in the U.S. for the week of April 17, 2020, though earning just $2,490 from a handful of drive-in theaters during the COVID-19 pandemic, with a total of $31,646 in its seven-week run up to that point.

Critical reception
Swallow received generally positive reviews from film critics. It holds an 88% approval rating on review aggregator website Rotten Tomatoes, based on 139 reviews, with an average of 7.4/10. The site's critical consensus reads, "Swallows unconventional approach to exploring domestic ennui is elevated by a well-told story and Haley Bennett's powerful leading performance." On Metacritic, the film holds a rating of 65 out of 100, based on 22 critics, indicating "generally favorable reviews".

Dissenting opinions included that of critic Barry Hertz of The Globe and Mail, who wrote that "Mirabella-Davis treats Hunter's behaviour with kid gloves — it is a disorder that the film treats as fit for gawking and disgust, not anything close to understanding or empathy."

References

External links
 
 
 
 

2019 films
2019 horror thriller films
2019 independent films
2019 psychological thriller films
2019 thriller drama films
2010s English-language films
2010s feminist films
2010s pregnancy films
2010s psychological drama films
American body horror films
American feminist films
American horror thriller films
American independent films
American pregnancy films
American psychological drama films
American psychological thriller films
American thriller drama films
English-language French films
Films about eating disorders
Films set in New York (state)
Films shot in New York (state)
French feminist films
French horror thriller films
French independent films
French pregnancy films
French psychological drama films
French psychological thriller films
French thriller drama films
Pica (disorder)
2010s American films
2010s French films